"Energy" is a song by Australian musicians Stace Cadet and KLP. It was released on 24 April 2020 and peaked at number 70 on the ARIA Singles Chart, becoming both artists' first single to peak inside the ARIA top 100.

The song peaked at number 1 on the ARIA club tracks for four weeks in May and June 2020. Various remixes of the song have been released since July 2020.

At the ARIA Music Awards of 2020, the song was nominated for ARIA Award for Best Dance Release.

Reception
A Triple J reviewer called the track "A high-intensity club track complete with rave sirens, a deep groove bassline and KLP's signature vocals primed to hype up the club!"

A Music Feeds reviewer said "The title says it all – it's a club-ready banger oriented around its grooving bass line, hypnotic percussion and KLP's vocals, guaranteed to make dance floors go off whenever that's allowed again."

Track listing

Charts

Weekly charts

Year-end charts

Certifications

References

2020 singles
2020 songs
Stace Cadet songs
KLP (musician) songs
Song recordings produced by Stace Cadet
Songs written by KLP (musician)
Songs written by Stace Cadet